Steve Bent (born 9 April 1961) is a British former cyclist. He competed in the individual pursuit and team pursuit events at the 1984 Summer Olympics.

References

External links
 

1961 births
Living people
British male cyclists
Olympic cyclists of Great Britain
Cyclists at the 1984 Summer Olympics
Cyclists from Greater London
20th-century British people